Bonaventura Corti (26 February 1729 – 3 February 1813) was an Italian Jesuit priest and naturalist who contributed to studies on microscopic organisms including the rotifers, ciliates and algae. He coined the word "plantanimal" for plant-like organisms which moved and which could be revived from desiccation through the addition of water.

Corti was born in Viano in the landed family of Giulio and Vittoria Bondioli but orphaned at an early age, he was taken care of by a relative who initiated him into priesthood in 1740. He studied at the Jesuit seminary of Reggio Emilia where he took an early interest in science. He was ordained in 1754 and became a teacher of metaphysics and geometry at the seminary. In 1757 he took an interest in comets. He succeeded Lazzaro Spallanzani at the Collegio di San Nazario in Reggio Emilia in 1768. In 1771 he took an interest in microscopic organisms looking at the flow of fluid (protoplasmic streaming) within Charophyte algae. He also examined the movements in Tremella in his publication and failed to note the earlier observations of Felice Fontana who complained of plagiarism. He became Rector of the church and confessor to the Duchess of Modena before his death in Reggio Emilia.

Works

References

External links 
 Osservazioni microscopiche sulla Tremella e sulla circolazione del fluido in una pianta acquajuola dell'abate Bonaventura Corti professore di fisica nel collegio di Reggio (1774)

1729 births
1813 deaths
Jesuit scientists